Michael Tien Puk-sun (born 25 August 1950) is a Hong Kong politician, businessman and member of the Legislative Council for New Territories North West. He is the founder and chairman of the G2000 clothing retail chain and former chairman of the Kowloon-Canton Railway Corporation (KCRC). He was formerly a member of the Liberal Party, which was led by his elder brother, James Tien, and a member of the New People's Party.

History
Tien was appointed as the chairman of the Kowloon-Canton Railway Corporation (KCRC) in December 2001 amid public criticism on his predecessor, K. Y. Yeung. He proposed and implemented administrative reforms that enhanced KCRC's transparency and accountability; he regularly attended Legco meeting and explained the company's policies and decisions. In 2006, Tien resigned as chairman of the KCRC due to disputes with other directors over his management style.

Tien joined the Liberal Party in 2008 and became District Officer for Kowloon West. He quit the party in 2010 and started the New People's Party with Regina Ip, of which he became the deputy chairman.

In the 2017 Chief Executive election, Tien supported his party chairwoman Regina Ip. He complained the election had "lost its shape" due to the increasing interference of "an invisible hand", referring to the Liaison Office. Tien inclined his support for John Tsang after Ip dropped out, although Ip endorsed Carrie Lam on the last day before the election. Tien eventually quit the party on 10 April with six District Councillors.

In the 2019 District Council elections, Tien lost his Tsuen Wan District Council seat following a rout of pro-Beijing candidates amidst the 2019–20 Hong Kong protests. 

In December 2021, it was reported that Tien had a "privileged" vote in the 2021 Hong Kong legislative election, where the vote would count approximately 7,215 times more than an ordinary citizen.

Background and education
Tien attended Diocesan Boys' School and spent a year at Worcester Academy in the United States. Tien has a degree in electrical engineering from Cornell University and an MBA from Harvard Business School.

Property ownership 
According to Tien's January 2022 declaration of assets, he owns property in Hong Kong, mainland China, and the United States.

Current posts
 Member of the Legislative Council of Hong Kong (New Territories North West (2021 constituency))
 Member of National People’s Congress, PRC (Hong Kong Deputy)
 Chairman of Employees Retraining Board (ERB)
 Chairman of Standing Committee on Language Education and Research (SCOLAR)
 Member of Manpower Development Committee (MDC)
 Member of Education Commission (EC)
 Chairman of Retail Industry Working Group under the Skills Upgrading Scheme (EDB)
 Supervisor of David Li Kwok Po College

Previous posts
 Chairman of Kowloon-Canton Railway Corporation (KCRC)
 Chairman of the Privatization Sub-group of the Business Advisory Group (BAG), under the Financial Secretary’s Office
 Chairman of Wholesale, Retail, Import & Export Training Board, Vocational Training Council (VTC)
 Chairman of Working Group on Professional Relevance Advisory Committee on Teacher Education & Qualification (ACTEQ)
 Chairman of Advisory Committee to School of Design, Hong Kong Polytechnic University
 Member of Hong Kong Broadcasting Authority
 Council Member of Hong Kong Productivity Council (HKPC)
 Member of Language Fund Advisory Committee (LFAC), Education Department
 Member of Tsuen Wan District Council (Discovery Park Constituency)
 Alternate Member of Listing Committee, Hong Kong Stock Exchange
 Member of Hong Kong Sports Development Board
 Director of The Community Chest of Hong Kong
 Chairman, Liberal Party Kowloon West Regional Office

References

External links
 Official site

Hong Kong chief executives
Kowloon-Canton Railway Corporation
Worcester Academy alumni
Cornell University College of Engineering alumni
Harvard Business School alumni
Delegates to the 11th National People's Congress from Hong Kong
Delegates to the 12th National People's Congress from Hong Kong
Delegates to the 13th National People's Congress from Hong Kong
Living people
Liberal Party (Hong Kong) politicians
New People's Party (Hong Kong) politicians
District councillors of Tsuen Wan District
1950 births
HK LegCo Members 2012–2016
HK LegCo Members 2016–2021
HK LegCo Members 2022–2025
Members of the Election Committee of Hong Kong, 2007–2012
Hong Kong fashion businesspeople
Hong Kong textiles industry businesspeople